Arjun Suravaram is a 2019 Indian Telugu-language action thriller film written and directed by T. Santhosh. The film stars Nikhil Siddharth and Lavanya Tripathi. It is produced by Rajkumar Akella, and presented by B. Madhu on the Movie Dynamix banner. Sam C. S. composed the film's music, while Naveen Nooli handled the editing and Suryaa handled the cinematography. It is a remake of the director's own Tamil film Kanithan (2016). The film released on 29 November 2019. It received positive reviews from critics and was commercially successful.

Plot 
The film's story takes place in the backdrop of News television channels. The protagonist. Arjun Suravaram (Nikhil Siddharth), is a third-generation journalist who takes to the profession despite opposition from his idealistic but now skeptical father (Nagineedu), who feels that the fourth estate has lost its moral compass in the present times and hence his son should stay away from journalism. Arjun nurses a deep desire and dream: to become an investigative journalist with an international TV Channel of repute. However, as feared by his father, the young reporter gets himself trapped in a fake educational loan and certificate scam, which he now has to unearth in order to prove his innocence, as well as to help the society at large, to cleanse the system of such evils. Kavya (Lavanya Tripathi) is Arjun’s love interest, an aspiring journalist, and the daughter of the owner (Kedar Shankara) of a TV channel that Arjun works for. Together as they try to unravel the mystery of the scam, they discover that there is a far more sinister network beneath the surface, and their life is under grave threat from the evil forces. Will they survive to bring the truth to the fore?

Cast

Soundtrack 

Music is composed by Sam C. S., and released on Lahari Music/T-Series Telugu. "Kanne Kanne" and "Che Guevara" are covers of the songs with same title from the Tamil films Ayogya and Kanithan respectively, the latter of which this film is a remake of.

Release 
Initially, movie was titled as Mudra and was scheduled to release on 8 November 2018, after failing to release on 8 November, on 12 November 2018 it was announced the movie will be releasing on 28 December 2018, eventually failed to release. Meanwhile on 25 January 2019, a movie with same title (Mudra) long delayed Jagapathi Babu's film was released. To avoid title conflict, title was changed to Arjun Suravaram and scheduled to release on 29 March 2019, later re-scheduled due to financial problems and pushed to 1 May 2019, which eventually failed to release both the times. After many delays movie was released on 29 November 2019.

Reception

Box office 
On the opening day, Arjun Suravaram grossed 4.1 crore, and 12.3 crore in the first weekend worldwide. In its lifetime, Arjun Suravaram grossed 21 crore at the global box office.

Critical reception 
Arjun Suravaram received positive reviews from critics. Deccan Chronicle gave 3 out of 5 stars stating, "Arjun Suravaram deserves to be watched. The director should be appreciated for taking up a topical issue, that of fake certificates. Nikhil Siddharth, as the investigative reporter, puts in a sincere performance, and he is convincing. Cinematography by Surya is good, and the action scenes are choreographed nicely". Sangeetha Devi Dundoo of The Hindu wrote, "The film is engrossing when it focuses on its main plot. Nikhil has the knack for choosing interesting stories and effectively portrays the part of a purpose-driven reporter who is vulnerable when the tables turn against him. Lavanya as the aspiring journalist has a role that’s comparatively limited in scope, but she does it efficiently, and Sahi Suresh’s art direction and Suryaa’s cinematography deserve a mention."

123Telugu.com gave 3.25 stars stating "Arjun Suravaram is an engaging crime thriller with a novel concept. The thrills showcased, breezy narration, and Nikhil’s performance are basic assets. Nikhil’s long wait will surely pay dividends for him". Industryhit.com gave 3.25 stars stating "The message along with the thrills with uncompromising production values makes Arjun Suravaram a must-watch big-screen flick". Indiaglitz.com gave 3 out of 5 stars stating "The premise and storyline are exciting. Good performances and some nice technical output help. The Hans India gave 3 out of 5 stars stating "BGM and Nikhil are the highlights of the film".

References

External links 
 

2019 films
2010s Telugu-language films
2019 action thriller films
Indian action thriller films
Films about the mass media in India
Action films based on actual events
Journalism adapted into films
Films scored by Sam C. S.
Films about journalists
Films about organised crime in India
Films about security and surveillance
Thriller films based on actual events
Indian crime thriller films
Films about corruption in India
Fictional portrayals of the Telangana Police
Films about fraud
Telugu remakes of Tamil films
2019 crime thriller films